Shepherd High School may refer to:

Shepherd High School, in the Shepherd Public School District in Shepherd, Michigan
Shepherd High School (Montana), Shepherd, Montana
Shepherd High School (Texas), Shepherd, Texas
Shepherd Hill Regional High School, Dudley, Massachusetts